Steve DeAngelo (born June 12, 1958) is an American cannabis rights activist and advocate for cannabis reform in the United States.

Career 
Steve DeAngelo is a co-founder and chairman emeritus of Harborside Inc., a publicly-traded cannabis company listed on the Canadian Securities Exchange. Harborside has a monopolized supply chain with dispensary locations in Oakland, San Jose, San Leandro and Desert Hot Spring. The latter has the distinction of being the second dispensary in California to feature a drive-thru. Harborside Health Center was founded in 2006 as a non-profit medical cannabis dispensary and had more than 300,000 registered medical patients. In 2016, the company rebranded as Harborside Inc. in preparation for the new legal adult-use market in California. 

DeAngelo is also co-founder of Steep Hill, Inc., the first commercial cannabis lab in the country, and co-founder of Arcview Group, the first cannabis investment firm. DeAngelo formerly served Arcview as vice president.

DeAngelo is the author of The Cannabis Manifesto: A New Paradigm for Wellness.

Last Prisoner Project
In 2019, Last Prisoner Project was founded by Steve DeAngelo, Dean Raise, and Andrew DeAngelo. The main idea behind this project is that no one should go to jail for minor cannabis-related crimes. The project brings together people who have been affected by the criminal justice system, along with experts in policy and education, and leaders in drug policy reform to put an end to the unfairness of America's policy on cannabis prohibition.

Activism

Early on as an activist, DeAngelo was skipping school to attend anti-war demonstrations and eventually dropped out to join the Youth International Party – also known as the Yippies. He went on to become the lead organizer of the annual Fourth of July Smoke-In in D.C., carrying the position for a decade. DeAngelo graduated summa cum laude from the University of Maryland. He also opened a legendary D.C. counter-cultural gathering place that became known as a refuge for local cannabis and peace activists during the Reagan-Bush era, including William Kunstler, Wavy Gravy, and author Jack Herer.

DeAngelo helped Jack Herer edit and publish the manuscript for his soon-to-be-famous book, “ The Emperor Wears No Clothes,” and became a lead organizer of the first Hemp Museum and Hemp Tour. He created his first cannabis business, Ecolution; the company was one of the first to ride an industrial hemp boom, manufacturing hemp clothing and accessories for retail sales in 50 states and 21 countries during the ’90s.

Bibliography

References

1958 births
Living people
Yippies
Activists from Washington, D.C.
American cannabis activists
Businesspeople in the cannabis industry